Ana Rich Vukićević (born as Ana Nikolić, ; 1 January 1983) is a Serbian-born Bulgarian pop singer, dancer and choreographer. Ana Rich was born in Belgrade, SFR Yugoslavia.

Early life and education
Ana Rich was born in Belgrade, at fifteen years of age she started first steps of Jazz dance.
As she was very talented she danced in famous dance school Trik FX,  with whom she had many public appearances.

Ana attended Dental school in Belgrade, and after graduated in Tourism. 
During the fourth quarter of 2020, she started attending Faculty of law at University of Priština.

Career
She released her first single Duplo Golo in 2010.
During the 2011 she became a part of Funky G popular Serbian dance music group near Gagi Djogani who is the leader of the band and Marija Mijanović singer .
After one year of cooperation, five singles, she left Funky G at the end of 2012 and continue her career as a solo singer, the main reason for the termination of cooperation with Funky G was her different view of the band's future, some disagreements with the band leader Gagi Djogani, as well as Ana’s wish for independent advancement. 

Ana released new single  Daj mi se in 2013.

She take a part in the Balkan famous singing competition Zvezde Granda in 2018, in the second round she sang two songs, Rukuju se rukuju of well known former Yugoslav, pop rock band 80s Zana and Da li si to ti of Ana Kokić.   Although she failed to qualify in the third round of competition, she aroused a lot of sympathy and shock of the audience and jury, who compared her to famous Serbian singer and media personality Jelena Karleuša because of her fashion style during competition.

Trivia
Since 2017, she has identified as vegetarian and advocates for animal rights, she also has Bulgarian descent.

Television appearances 

Zvezde Granda TV Prva (2017/18); competitor

Discography

Singles

 Jača nego pre Funky G (2012)
 Nije moja ljubav slepa Funky G (2012)
 Zlatna ribica Funky G (2012)
 Godina zmaja Funky G (2012)
 Svidja li ti se moja draga Funky G (featuring Igor x  ) (2012)
 Duplo Golo, Ana Rich (2010)
 Daj mi se, Ana Rich (2013)

Videography
 Jača nego pre Funky G (2012)
 Duplo Golo, Ana Rich (2010)
 Daj mi se, Ana Rich (2013)

Awards and nominations

See also
Music of Serbia
List of singers from Serbia
Zvezde Granda
Serbian pop

References

External links
 Ana Rich Ana Rich Grand Online

1983 births
Living people
Singers from Belgrade
21st-century Serbian women singers
Serbian folk-pop singers
Serbian pop singers
Bulgarian people of Serbian descent